WVFW-LD, virtual and VHF digital channel 8, is a low-powered Estrella TV owned-and-operated television station in Miami, Florida, United States. The station is owned by Estrella Media. It was the network's second affiliate in the market; Estrella TV previously affiliated in Miami with the second subchannel of Sunbeam Television's Fox affiliate, WSVN (channel 7) to provide full-market coverage to South Florida. WSVN-DT2 switched to Light TV on July 14, 2017, temporarily leaving Estrella without much Miami cable coverage. The station allows homes that have trouble receiving WGEN's VHF signal or only a UHF antenna to receive WGEN in some form.

WVFW-LD's signal also served a second purpose, as it provided the signal source for Estrella's national feed carried by pay television providers in markets without an Estrella TV affiliate on terrestrial TV. This was seen in the feed top-of-the-hour station identification sequence, which formerly identified WVFW-LD. Previously, the station was owned by and aired programming from Almavision, and its life dates back to 1983, when it was launched as a Monroe County-owned repeater station of PBS member station WPBT (channel 2) licensed to Marathon.

WVFW-LD's future fate is undetermined in the wake of Liberman's announcement of the purchase of Key West-licensed WGEN-TV (channel 8) on January 8, 2018 (it began to carry Estrella TV on March 1 and also became the national pay television source), though WGEN has guaranteed full carriage in the Miami area. However, it has been retained as its transmitter decently covers Miami and Fort Lauderdale, whereas WGEN has to use several repeaters to cover the inner core of the Miami/Fort Lauderdale metro.

Digital television

Digital channels

References

External links
Official Website
IPTV Channels

Low-power television stations in the United States
Estrella TV affiliates
VFW-LD
VFW-LD
Estrella Media stations
1983 establishments in Florida
Television channels and stations established in 1983
Hispanic and Latino American culture in Miami